Technisches Rathaus is located in Munich, Bavaria, Germany.

Buildings and structures in Munich